"Baby Hold On to Me" is the song written by Gerald Levert and Edwin Nicholas.

The song was released as an R&B single by singer Gerald Levert with The O'Jays star Eddie Levert from LeVert's 1991 debut album, Private Line.  The song spent one week at number one on the US R&B chart and was Gerald Levert's first Top 40 pop chart single as a solo artist, peaking at number 37.

References

See also
List of number-one R&B singles of 1992 (U.S.)

1991 singles
1991 songs
Songs written by Gerald Levert